The list of shipwrecks in 2016 includes ships sunk, foundered, grounded, or otherwise lost during 2016.

January

4 January

7 January

8 January

10 January

13 January

16 January

18 January

20 January

22 January

25 January

26 January

29 January

31 January

February

2 February

3 February

 She was refloated on 9 February and taken in to Hamburg.

11 February

12 February

13 February

16 February

18 February

20 February

21 February

25 February

27 February

28 February

29 February

March

1 March

3 March

4 March

6 March

7 March

10 March

11 March

12 March

14 March

15 March

17 March

21 March

23 March

31 March

Unknown date

April

1 April

6 April

9 April

13 April

17 April

19 April

20 April

23 April

26 April

28 April

29 April

May

4 May

5 May

7 May

9 May

21 May

27 May

30 May

31 May

June

1 June

9 June

11 June

13 June

16 June

17 June

18 June

27 June

28 June

July

5 July

9 July

10 July

13 July

14 July

15 July

18 July

19 July

20 July

22 July

30 July

August

1 August

2 August

3 August

6 August

7 August

8 August

9 August

14 August

15 August

17 August

18 August

20 August

29 August

September

3 September

4 September

9 September

13 September

14 September

15 September

18 September

19 September

20 September

21 September

22 September

23 September

24 September

25 September

26 September

30 September

October

1 October

5 October

10 October

12 October

14 October

15 October

18 October

19 October

20 October

21 October

22 October

23 October

25 October

29 October

November

1 November

2 November

3 November

4 November

7 November

9 November

10 November

14 November

15 November

16 November

17 November

20 November

22 November

25 November

27 November

28 November

29 November

December

2 December

3 December

4 December

5 December

7 December

9 December

12 December

14 December

15 December

23 December

24 December

26 December

28 December

31 December

Unknown date

References

2016
 
Shipwrecks